Veiled is the first album by the American singer/songwriter Leah Andreone, released in 1996 (see 1996 in music).

Track listing
All songs by Leah Andreone and Rick Neigher, except where noted.
"It's Alright, It's OK"
"Happy Birthday"
"Mother Tongue"
"You Make Me Remember"
"Who Are They to Say"
"Problem Child"
"Come Sunday Morning"
"Kiss Me Goodbye"
"Hell to Pay" (Leah Andreone, David Andreone, Rick Neigher)
"Will You Still Love Me"
"Imagining You"

Personnel
Leah Andreone – vocals
Rick Neigher – bass guitar, electric guitar, acoustic guitar, keyboards, organ, harmonica
David Raven – drums
John Shanks – electric guitar
Kevin Saviger – keyboards, organ
Rami Jaffee – organ
Debra Dobkin – percussion
Neal Avron – trumpet

Chart performance

References

1996 debut albums
Leah Andreone albums